Euchaetes gigantea is a moth of the family Erebidae. It was described by William Barnes and James Halliday McDunnough in 1910. It is found in the US states of Arizona, New Mexico and Oklahoma.

References

 

Phaegopterina
Moths described in 1910